Hot Gossip (1974–86) were a British dance troupe who made television appearances and in 1978 backed Sarah Brightman on her single "I Lost My Heart to a Starship Trooper".

Formation
Arlene Phillips moved to London to learn and teach developing American jazz dance routines. Employed as a dance teacher, she taught at locations including the Pineapple Dance Studios and the Italia Conti Stage School. In 1974, Phillips started forming the core of a troupe; Italia Conti student actress Lesley Manville turned her down. Hot Gossip spent two years performing in Munkberry's club in Jermyn Street, London W1, where Phillips and manager/producers Michael Summerton and Iain Burton developed the group's dance act. Phillips, Summerton and Burton continued to work together for eight years, during which time Hot Gossip continued to enjoy wide popularity and success.

Career

The Kenny Everett Video Show
Spotted by the British television director David Mallet, he invited Phillips to make Hot Gossip a regular feature of the 1978 The Kenny Everett Video Show, which he directed for Thames Television on ITV. The show ended in 1981 on ITV. Everett then moved to the BBC for The Kenny Everett Television Show, which did not feature Hot Gossip except in Season 4 in 1986.

Music
In 1978, during their initial impact period on The Kenny Everett Video Show, Hot Gossip recorded "Making Love on a Phone" and with Sarah Brightman on lead vocals recorded "I Lost My Heart to a Starship Trooper", a disco song written by Jeff Calvert and Geraint Hughes, the men behind the 1975 hit record, "Barbados". "I Lost My Heart to a Starship Trooper" reached number 6 on the UK Singles Chart. They went on to record an album in 1981 titled Geisha Boys and Temple Girls, produced by former Human League and then current Heaven 17/BEF member Martyn Ware. A stand-out track called "I Burn for You" was written by Sting.

The Very Hot Gossip Show
Produced by Burton and Telecast by Channel 4, the one-hour special was a vehicle for Hot Gossip, fresh from their stint on The Kenny Everett Video Show. The Very Hot Gossip Show was one of the highest rating shows for Channel 4 that year.

Style
Hot Gossip were noted for the risqué nature of their costumes and the dance routines, all designed and choreographed by Phillips, especially considering the early evening timeslot that the Video Show was broadcast in. The male athletic dancers were handsome and black and the female members were attractive and white, which caused pulses to race for various reasons. It is said that the antics did nothing to improve race relations, but all the same was the height of entertainment. They are often credited as one of the UK's early television dance troupes, continuing a trend which started with the Go-Jo's and Pan's People on Top of the Pops.

The group was once spoofed on The Benny Hill Show as Hot Gossamer, with references to the Hot Gossip routines 'Supernature' and 'Walk on the Wild Side'. Some former Hot Gossip dancers appeared on the show, notably Jane Colthorpe and Lorraine Doyle were members of Love Machine. Then later Lorraine Doyle featured heavily in sketches as well as part of the Hill's Angels dance troupe.

Original Kenny Everett TV group members
Males: Mark Tyme, Roy Gale, Floyd Pearce
Females: Dominique Wood, Donna Fielding, Carol Fletcher, Perri Lister, Lyndsey Ward, Sarah Brightman and Lorraine Whitmarsh.

Dancers who performed with Hot Gossip

Amanda Abbs
Heather Alexander
Debbie Ash 
Debbie Astell
Bunty Bailey
Elvis Baptiste
Lee Black
Richard Bodkin
Sarah Brightman
Bonnie Bryg
Kathy Burke ††
Lindsay Cole
Titian Deakin
Lorraine Doyle
Annie Dunkley
Penni Dunlop
Sandy Easby
Mark Elie
Yvonne Evans (Voyd)
Donna Fielding
Carol Fletcher
Alan Forgie
Debbie Fox
Judey Ford
Julia Gale
Roy Gayle
Donnette Goddard
Heavon Grant
Virginia Hartley
Alison Hierlehy
Nicky Hinkley
Laura James
Lavinia Lang (Hudson)
Kim Leeson
Perri Lister
Richard Lloyd King
Madeleine Loftin
Erin Lordan
Barry Martin
Jayne Melville
Sarah Miles †
Johanna Kate Morley
Jane Colthorpe
Trudy Pack
Floid Pearce
Tristan Rafael
Sinitta Renet
Heather Robbins
Wanda Rokicki
Heather Seymour
Sonia Talbot
Bruno Tonioli
Mark Tyme
Lyndsey Ward
Susie Waring
Lorraine Whitmarsh
Chrissy Wickham
David Wilkins
Phillipa Williams
Frances Wingate
Dominique Wood
 Penny Kendell
 Michelle Gail Fellows
 Libby Rose
 Cherry B

†  Not to be confused with the actress of the same name

†† Not to be confused with the actress of the same name

Sponooch
There was a spin-off group from Hot Gossip. In late 1979 Mark Tyme, Dom Wood, Lorraine Whitmarsh, Carol Fletcher, Lyndsey Ward, Donna Fielding and Lee Black left Hot Gossip to set up 'Sponooch'. They were featured in a BBC show called Dancing Girls on 6 January 1982 and they were featured several times on a TV show in 1979 called Friday Night Saturday Morning on BBC One. They also were signed to EMI and recorded two singles, "Crime Buster" and  "Lady Dracula".

References

External links
Hot Gossip discography on Discogs

Dance companies in the United Kingdom
British dance music groups